The Rapier 65 is a homebuilt biplane designed by Frank Hernandez.

Design
The plane's fuselage is constructed of welded steel tubing with fabric covering. The wingspars are made of wood, with fabric covering. Ailerons are on the lower wings only.

Specifications (Rapier 65)

References

Homebuilt aircraft